Freestar is a name used more than once:

 FREESTAR, a science package, including MEIDEX, SOLSE and other experiments, carried on  during STS-107.
 Ford Freestar, a car designed by Ford Motor Company.
Freestar is an alcohol free beer made in the UK